Julian Christopher (born November 7, 1944) is an American actor. He is best known for his roles in various films and television series from the 1970s to the present, including The Magician and the episode 'Code of Honor' from Star Trek: The Next Generation. His most notable appearances, which includes his Star Trek: The Next Generation role, were in the films Cool Breeze, X-Men: The Last Stand, Elysium and 88 Minutes.

Filmography

External links
 

1944 births
African-American male actors
American male television actors
Living people
Male actors from Philadelphia
20th-century American male actors
21st-century American male actors
20th-century African-American people
21st-century African-American people